Abbey of San Clemente may refer to:

Abbey of San Clemente a Casauria, in the province of Pescara, Abruzzo
Abbey of San Clemente al Volmano, in the province of Teramo, Abruzzo